This is a list of yearly Association of Mid-Continent Universities football standings.

Mid-Continent standings

References

Mid-Continent Conference
Standings